Panery Assembly constituency is one of the 126 assembly constituencies of Assam Legislative Assembly. Panery forms part of the Mangaldoi Lok Sabha constituency.

Members of Legislative Assembly 

 1972:  Ramesh Chandra Saharia, Indian National Congress
 1978:  Ramesh Chandra Saharia, Indian National Congress
 1983:  Mridula Saharia, Indian National Congress
 1985:  Durga Das Boro, Indian National Congress
 1991:  Karendra Basumatari, Indian National Congress
 1996:  Kumud Chandra Das, Indian National Congress
 2001:  Kamali Basumatari, Indian National Congress
 2006:  Kamali Basumatari, Indian National Congress
 2011:  Kamali Basumatari,  Bodoland Peoples Front
 2016:  Kamali Basumatari, Bodoland Peoples Front
 2021:  Biswajit Daimary, Bharaita Janata Party

Election results

2021 result

2016 result

References

External links 
 

Assembly constituencies of Assam